Hark! is the 13th solo studio album by Andrew Bird, released on December 11, 2020. It is Bird's first full-length holiday-themed release.

Six songs from the album initially appeared on an EP, also titled Hark!, which was released digitally in November 2019.

Reception
Andrea Warner of CBC Music praised Bird's cover of Vince Guaraldi's "Skating" from A Charlie Brown Christmas, stating "Bird's innovative and creative cover...is both familiar and jolting, warm and angular, evoking the joy of spinning circles on a frozen lake as the wind gently cuts paths across your cheeks."

Track listing

References

2020 albums
Andrew Bird albums